is a Japanese yuri manga series by Sato. It was serialized online via Akita Shoten's Manga Cross website between 2013 and 2014. It was collected in two tankōbon volumes. The manga is licensed in North America by Seven Seas Entertainment. An original video animation adaptation by Tear Studio and East Fish Studio was released on November 22, 2019 in Japan.

Plot 

Quiet and shy high school student Misuzu Moritani has the ability to stop time for three minutes every day. One day, as classmate Yukari Kobayashi enquires if she's interested in joining a club. She stops time and runs down to the courtyard to take a peek at Haruka Murakami's panties. Murakami is the most popular girl in the school. To her surprise, Moritani finds out Murakami is the only person unaffected by her power.

The next day, Moritani stops time again and runs out of the classroom, Murakami in tow. In the hallway, Murakami asks her if she likes her, and whether she's free the following Sunday. When they meet up on Sunday, Murakami designates it a date, startling Moritani. Whilst shopping at a lingerie store, Murakami spots her boyfriend Tamaki, with a girl from another class. Proclaiming him to be her ex, Murakami says she never really loved him in the first place, and walks off. Annoyed, Moritani hoists a pair of panties on Tamaki's face, and urges Murakami to join in with a lipstick.

The days immediately following, Moritani stops the time every day, digging into everyone's secrets at school. During one such period, Murakami puts Moritani's hand on her bosom after she acknowledges that "somehow, [their] secret time made [her] heart beat faster", and expresses the same feeling. At the gym, Murakami plays basketball, whilst Moritani silently observes how she is well-liked from the sidelines. She unconsciously stops the time, fibbing she wanted to give Murakami a little break. Back in the classroom, Murakami is helping out several classmates whilst Moritani watches from her desk, and stops time yet again. She reflects on the meaning of this, positing that she wants to have Murakami all to herself.

The next day, whilst Murakami is engaged in a conversation with her friends, Moritani stops time again. Murakami confronts her and asks her if she is doing it on purpose, and telling her to stop if it were the case. Moritani slowly feels a gulf build up between her and Murakami, asking herself what she's doing. After a few days pass without Moritani stopping her time, she is in the school's sickbay when Murakami comes to visit. Murakami gently encourages Moritani to say what she wants to say, and as the nurse comes in to check on them, Moritani freezes time and gives her a kiss – Murakami reciprocates.

They agree to start going out. In exchange, Murakami asks Moritani for the two of them to only ever be alone together. In the washroom, she reflects on her loneliness – and hearing several girls gossiping about Murakami, contends that the latter has it worse than her. Whilst sitting for a test, Moritani freezes time yet again, and Murakami stands on her desk and strips – telling her to do whatever she liked with her. They share an intimate moment with each other, and Moritani reflects that "the perfect honour student, Murakami-san, wants to sin". When Moritani asks her to put her clothes back on before time unfreezes, she looks disappointed.

The next day, Kobayashi chats her up, remarking this is the one time she hasn't disappeared when she was talking to her, and glad to know that she's not hated. The both of them go to eat with their friend group, and one of the girls strikes up a discussion about Murakami. Kobayashi remarks that she's never talked to her, whilst Moritani looks over at Murakami, remarking that she looks lonely. At the end of the school day, Moritani stops time, saying to Murakami that it looked like she was in pain. Murakami doesn't really want to talk about it. The next day, she's napping at her desk when Kobayashi wakes her up and takes her outside for some fresh air. They talk about what kind of job they put down on the career survey, and Kobayashi says she wishes to become a mangaka. Whilst cleaning the hallway, Moritani overhears some of her classmates derisively discussing Kobayashi's career choice – she stops time and snatches Kobayashi's survey answers.

All the while, Murakami was observing from outside the classroom, and confronts Moritani about breaking their promise. To prove her intention of keeping the promise, Moritani lifts her skirt and reveals she's wearing the same underwear as her. Murakami does the same, and time seemingly unfreezes, and they run away as their schoolmates look on. The following day, other students are gossiping about Murakami flashing Moritani – not knowing who it was intended for. Outside, Kobayashi thanks Moritani for retrieving her career survey – Moritani starts confiding in her about her diminishing powers and her relationship with Murakami, albeit pretending it's not about her. Kobayashi counsels her that both Moritani and Murakami both need each other, and that they should talk and work it out. Moritani is happy she was able to talk to someone about it, and Kobayashi is happy because Moritani felt comfortable enough with her to confide in her.

By the lockers, Moritani freezes time again and tells Murakami there's something she wants her to know. Murakami doesn't want to know and runs out of the school, whilst Moritani is attempting to tell her about her powers going away. Murakami tells her that whilst she still has powers, that they should help their classmates out with the little things. Moritani doesn't understand why she wants to do this. Murakami confides in her that she's always been an obedient girl, doing whatever anyone wanted of her. But with Moritani, when Murakami asked her to freeze time, she did so without asking why. She laments that no-one wants to know the real her; Moritani disagrees, and asks to get to know her better – starting by calling on her at home.

On the appointed day, Murakami welcomes Moritani to her home, telling her they would be alone until nightfall. Moritani asks to get to know her better, and Murakami tells her to do whatever she wants to do with her, again. Moritani is put off, and wants to know the real reason behind her behaviour. Murakami takes off her clothes, and tells her it is because this is what Moritani wants. Again, Moritani asks about the real reason she's going out with her – they are interrupted by the doorbell ringing. Murakami answers the door and hints for Moritani to look in the drawer, under the bed. Moritani finds flipbooks bearing the names, blood types, and dates of birth of the school's students and teachers, along with their likes and dislikes. Murakami reads to Moritani from her flipbook, remarking that "she always reads books by herself, not good at talking with her people, but immediately likes those who talk to her kindly". As well, "she is curious about people, but doesn't have courage – it doesn't matter who her partner is, as long as she's kind". Murakami concludes that only she can make herself stronger, and that sharing secrets with her is how to make her happy.

Moritani objects, whilst Murakami explains how she's been putting on a mask for everyone who interacts with her, adjusted to meet their likes and dislikes. She starts reading from her own flipbook, remarking that "she wants to be liked by everyone, shows a smiling, and that no-one hates her". Beyond that one page, the flipbook proves blank. Moritani returns home, feeling dejected – and that Murakami can't truly love anyone or anything because of this. She does not have any real wishes or wants. Moritani concludes that she needs to stop Murakami from running away and to get her to confront this fact. When Murakami next stands up in class, thinking that the time is frozen, Moritani stands up with her – time unfreezing along – and admits in front of the entire class what they've been up to. Murakami starts to say that they can't be together if she acts like this, but ends up running out of the class. Moritani gives chase and corners her on the stairs, and confronts her about her mask.

Murakami bristles at this, and charges at her, telling her she doesn't know the real her. Moritani tells her that the real her isn't like what's described in the flipbook about her, either. Murakami tells Moritani that all she ever wanted to be was a good girl who didn't stand out, fearing that no-one would like her. Moritani tells Murakami she likes her. She has a heart-to-heart moment of her own, thanking Murakami for reaching out to her even when she was being a loner – and that she respects her. They admit their love for each other. A few months later, Moritani's powers have disappeared entirely, but she's become more outgoing. She remarks that it is alright that she's re-joined the outside world, because Murakami is there, too.

Characters

 (Japanese); Caitlynn French (English)

 (Japanese); Genevieve Simmons (English)

 (Japanese); Natalie Rial (English)

Media

Manga

Anime
An anime adaptation was announced on March 16, 2019. It was later revealed that the adaptation would be a theatrical original video animation produced by Tear Studio and East Fish Studio, with Takuya Satō as director and scriptwriter. Tomoko Sudo is designing the characters, and Rionos is composing the series' music. The OVA premiered on November 22, 2019 and released on May 13, 2020 in Blu-ray/DVD.

Sentai Filmworks acquired the series for distribution.

References

External links
  
  
 

Akita Shoten manga
Japanese webcomics
LGBT in anime and manga
OVAs based on manga
Sentai Filmworks
Seven Seas Entertainment titles
Shōnen manga
Tear Studio
Webcomics in print
Yuri (genre) anime and manga